Jonathan Daniel Álvez Sagar (born 31 May 1988) is a Uruguayan footballer who plays as a forward for Unión de Santa Fe.

Club career

Uruguay
Born in Vichadero, Álvez came up from River Plate's youth system, but failed to appear as a senior with the first team. In 2008, he moved to Segunda División side Boston River, scoring his first senior goal on 29 November of that year in a 1–0 home win against Rocha.

In September 2009, Álvez joined Coraceros Polo Club in the Segunda División Amateur, and scored 13 goals for the side; highlights included a hat-trick in a 3–1 away win against Albion. He subsequently signed for fellow league team Platense, contributing with nine goals and narrowly missing out promotion.

In 2011, Álvez agreed to a deal with Torque, still in the third division. He achieved promotion to the second level in his first season as champions (also scoring the winner in the final against Canadian SC), and scored a 17 goals as his side missed out a consecutive promotion in the play-offs.

In February 2012, Álvez moved to Toluca with Torque teammate Nicolás Milesi on a trial basis, but nothing came of it. On 19 June 2013, he agreed to a one-year loan deal with Danubio.

Álvez made his Primera División debut on 18 August 2013, starting in a 0–0 away draw against Cerro Largo. On 14 September he scored his first goal in the category, netting the first in a 2–0 home win against Nacional.

Álvez scored 15 goals for Danubio during his spell, including two braces against Fénix and one against Racing Montevideo.

Vitória Guimarães (loan)

On 16 August 2014, Álvez moved abroad for the first time in his career, signing a one-year loan deal with Primeira Liga side Vitória Guimarães. He made his debut on 30 August, replacing Tomané in a 3–0 away win against Belenenses.

Álvez scored his first goal abroad on 19 September 2014, netting the equalizer in a 1–1 home draw against Paços de Ferreira. On 3 October, he scored a brace in a 3–0 home win against Boavista.

Álvez scored five goals for Vitória, but left the club in June 2015 after failing to agree new terms.

Ecuador
On 26 July 2015, Álvez signed for LDU Quito until the end of the year. He scored ten goals for the side in only 18 matches, as his side finished second after losing the finals to Emelec.

On 10 February 2016, Álvez was presented at Barcelona SC after agreeing to a four-year deal. In his first season, he scored 19 goals as his side was crowned champions.

Career statistics

Honours
Torque
Uruguayan Segunda División Amateur: 2011–12

Danubio
Uruguayan Primera División: 2013–14

Barcelona SC
Ecuadorian Serie A: 2016

References

External links

1988 births
Living people
Uruguayan footballers
Uruguayan expatriate footballers
Association football forwards
Club Nacional de Football players
Club Atlético River Plate (Montevideo) players
Boston River players
Montevideo City Torque players
Danubio F.C. players
Vitória S.C. players
L.D.U. Quito footballers
Barcelona S.C. footballers
Atlético Junior footballers
Atlético Nacional footballers
Unión de Santa Fe footballers
Categoría Primera A players
Campeonato Brasileiro Série A players
Sport Club Internacional players
Uruguayan Primera División players
Uruguayan Segunda División players
Ecuadorian Serie A players
Primeira Liga players
Argentine Primera División players
Uruguayan expatriate sportspeople in Portugal
Uruguayan expatriate sportspeople in Ecuador
Uruguayan expatriate sportspeople in Colombia
Uruguayan expatriate sportspeople in Brazil
Uruguayan expatriate sportspeople in Argentina
Expatriate footballers in Portugal
Expatriate footballers in Ecuador
Expatriate footballers in Colombia
Expatriate footballers in Brazil
Expatriate footballers in Argentina